The Mistassibi River is a river in central Quebec, Canada.

The name Mistassibi, only in use since the late 19th century, comes from the Innu-aimun language, meaning "large river". Its alternate name used to be Rivière aux Foins (Hay River).

Just like the nearby Mistassini River, the Mistassibi River runs in a north–south direction. It passes through Lac au Foin (Hay Lake) and among its tributaries are the aux Oiseaux, du Dépôt, and North-East Mistassibi Rivers. It drains into the Mistassini River at Dolbeau-Mistassini.

The company Minashtuk Inc. operates a 12 MW run-of-the-river hydroelectric power station on the Mistassibi River since 2000.

References

External links

Rivers of Saguenay–Lac-Saint-Jean